KTFX-FM is a radio station airing a country music format licensed to Warner, Oklahoma, broadcasting on 101.7 MHz FM. The station serves the Muskogee, Oklahoma area, and is owned by K95.5, Inc.

Translators

References

External links
KTFX-FM's official website

Country radio stations in the United States
TFX-FM
Muskogee, Oklahoma